Chinar Tadzhieva Rustamova is a diplomat from Turkmenistan. Throughout her career, she has been ambassador to Tajikistan, North Korea., China, Mongolia, and Vietnam.  As of 2022, she is currently the Executive Secretary of the National Commission of Turkmenistan for UNESCO.

In 2021, President Gurbanguly Berdimuhamedow awarded her the title “Hero of Turkmenistan.”

References

Women ambassadors
Ambassadors of Turkmenistan to China
Ambassadors to Mongolia
Ambassadors to Tajikistan
Ambassadors to Vietnam
Ambassadors to  North Korea
Year of birth missing (living people)
Living people